Defilement may refer to:

 Injury to or loss of sanctity
 Kleśā (Buddhism) - Buddhist concept
 Tumah - concept of ritual defilement in Judaism